The 1976 CONCACAF Pre-Olympic Tournament was the fourth edition of the CONCACAF Pre-Olympic Tournament, the quadrennial, international football tournament organised by the CONCACAF to determine which national teams from the North, Central America and Caribbean region qualify for the Olympic football tournament.

Mexico successfully defended their title, and qualified for the 1976 Summer Olympics together with runners-up Guatemala and the host nation, Canada, as representatives of CONCACAF. Cuba was invited after the withdrawal of Uruguay, the refusal of Argentina and Colombia to replace them.

Qualification

The three berths were allocated as follows:
The four winners from the second round

Qualified teams
The following teams qualified for the final tournament.

1 Only final tournament.

Final round

Qualified teams for the Summer Olympics
The following four teams from CONCACAF qualified for the 1976 Summer Olympics, including Canada which qualified as the hosts.

2 Bold indicates champions for that year. Italic indicates hosts for that year.

References

1976
Oly
Football qualification for the 1976 Summer Olympics